This is a list of movies made by the Indian director Lal Jose featuring the Indian music composer Vidyasagar.

History
Lal Jose began his career by assisting noted director Kamal. Vidyasagar's first Malayalam film Azhakiya Ravanan was directed by Kamal. Lal Jose was also the assistant director of the film.

In 1998, he made his debut as an independent director with Oru Maravathoor Kanavu, which starred Mammootty and was scripted by Sreenivasan. Lal Jose asked Vidyasagar to compose for his film. The huge success  Oru Maravathoor Kanavu earned him a positive reputation. The songs became very popular. Vidyasagar made a Christian devotional song Karunamayane in the movie, it was well appreciated by the audience and critics.

In 1999, his second directorial venture Chandranudikkunna Dikhil was released. The songs of the film was regarded as the best songs of Malayalam cinema in that year. Lal Jose worked with Vidyasagar for his first seven films continuously. all those films and songs were successful. Vidyasagar has won several awards for his compositions.

List of films

References

Indian filmographies
Films
Director filmographies